The Burke shadow ministry was a Shadow Cabinet led by the Opposition Leader and leader of the Labor Party, Brian Burke, in the Parliament of Western Australia. While serving no formal status—only the Leader and Deputy Leader received remuneration for their role over and above that of a Member of Parliament—it was intended to improve the effectiveness of the Opposition by providing an alternative Ministry to voters, consisting of shadow ministers who could ask role-specific questions in parliament, provide comment to the media and offer alternative policies to the government in their areas of responsibility.

The Burke shadow ministry existed from September 1981, after Burke's party-room defeat of then leader Ron Davies, until the 1983 state election at which Labor entered government and formed the Burke Ministry.

The governing Ministries at the time were the Court Ministry and the O'Connor Ministry.

The Shadow Ministry 

The following members of Parliament were members of the shadow ministry:

References

Government of Western Australia
Burke